Yuri Barashian ( (born October 18, 1979 in Feodosiya, Ukraine) is a Ukrainian professional boxer who held the European light-heavyweight title and challenged for the WBA light-heavyweight title in 2008.

Professional career
Barashian won the European light-heavyweight title in February 2008 with a knockout win over Thomas Ulrich. Following the win, he was ranked as a top contender for the WBA light-heavyweight title. He faced Hugo Garay in July 2008, but lost a unanimous decision. In his next bout, Barashian challenged WBO champion Zsolt Erdei but was again defeated via unanimous decision. The bout would have been contested for Erdei's title, but Barashian missed the weight limit, making it a non-title bout.

Professional boxing record

References

General references

External links

1979 births
Living people
People from Feodosia
Ukrainian male boxers
Light-heavyweight boxers